Vanceboro is a town in Craven County, North Carolina, United States. Its population was 1,005 at the 2010 Census. Originally called Swift Creek, residents renamed the town for Zebulon B. Vance after he visited there during his 1876 campaign for governor. It is part of the New Bern, North Carolina Metropolitan Statistical Area.

Geography

Demographics

2020 census

As of the 2020 United States census, there were 869 people, 464 households, and 318 families residing in the town.

2000 census
As of the census of 2000, there were 898 people, 385 households, and 262 families residing in the town. The population density was 521.2 inhabitants per square mile (201.6/km). There were 434 housing units at an average density of 251.9 per square mile (97.4/km). The racial makeup of the town was 73.16% White, 24.16% African American, 0.33% Native American, 0.56% from other races, and 1.78% from two or more races. Hispanic or Latino of any race were 1.89% of the population.   
    
There were 385 households, out of which 38.7% had children under the age of 18 living with them, 44.9% were married couples living together, 21.0% had a female householder with no husband present, and 31.7% were non-families. 29.6% of all households were made up of individuals, and 15.3% had someone living alone who was 65 years of age or older. The average household size was 2.32 and the average family size was 2.87.

Education

High school
West Craven High School

Middle school
West Craven Middle School

Elementary school
Vanceboro Farm Life Elementary School

Local festivals and celebrations

Every year, The Vanceboro Strawberry Festival takes place in Spring, usually in early May.  Festivities include a parade down Main Street, food, and games. Starting in 2006, the night before the parade there is a street dance.  Food and games are located on the grounds of Vanceboro Farm Life Elementary School.

References

External links

Towns in Craven County, North Carolina
Towns in North Carolina
New Bern micropolitan area